Darin Burns is a former professional Canadian football defensive lineman.

Playing career 

Burns began his career playing junior football for the Etobicoke Argonauts, Hamilton Hurricanes, and Burlington Braves (Hamilton Tiger-Cats' Junior affiliate team).

His stint with the Burlington Braves was particularly successful, producing a team captaincy, two All-Star appearances, and two Junior Shenley Awards for most outstanding player. As of 2010 Burns held franchise records for most career sacks, season sacks, and sacks in a single game. 
While playing for Burlington, Burns signed with the Hamilton Tiger-Cats and attended training camps from 1985–1986. In 1986 he was traded to the Montreal Alouettes and attended training camp. Later in Spring of 1987 he became the first non-university player to be invited to the CFL Combine. The Montreal Allouettes organization folded in June 1987 soon after Burns was signed, which resulted in Burns later being signed by the Ottawa Rough Riders in 1988.

Personal life 

Burns played an extra on ten episodes of Quebec television series Lobby.

References 

1964 births
Living people
Canadian football defensive linemen